Michelle Ruether Venturella (born May 11, 1973) is an American, former collegiate All-American, gold medal winning Olympian, left-handed softball player and former Head Coach, originally from Indianapolis, Indiana. Venturella played for the Indiana Hoosiers in the Big Ten Conference, being named a three-time all-conference honoree and the 1994 Player of The Year. She later served as an alternate for the 1996 Olympics and then winning a gold medal at the 2000 Sydney Olympics for Team USA softball. She is the former head coach at Washington University in St. Louis.

Career

She competed at the 2000 Summer Olympics in Sydney where she received a gold medal with the American team.

Ventruella played NCAA softball at Indiana University. She was the head coach of the Washington University in St. Louis softball team.

Statistics

Indiana Hoosiers

References

External links

 
 

1973 births
Living people
Indiana Hoosiers softball players
UIC Flames softball coaches
Olympic softball players of the United States
Softball players from Indiana
Softball coaches from Indiana
Softball players at the 2000 Summer Olympics
Olympic gold medalists for the United States in softball
Medalists at the 2000 Summer Olympics
Sportspeople from Gary, Indiana
Iowa Hawkeyes softball coaches
Northern Illinois Huskies softball coaches
Educators from Indiana
American women educators
Washington University Bears coaches